Yongge Wang (born 1967) is a computer science professor at the University of North Carolina at Charlotte specialized in algorithmic complexity and cryptography. He is the inventor of IEEE P1363 cryptographic standards SRP5 and WANG-KE and has contributed to the mathematical theory of algorithmic randomness. He co-authored a paper demonstrating that a recursively enumerable real number is an algorithmically random sequence if and only if it is a Chaitin's constant for some encoding of programs. He also showed the separation of Schnorr randomness from recursive randomness. He also invented a distance based statistical testing technique to improve NIST SP800-22 testing in randomness tests. In cryptographic research, he is known for the invention of the quantum resistant random linear code based encryption scheme RLCE.

References

External links
 Yongge Wang's homepage
 Quantum Resistant RLCE Encryption Scheme homepage

Modern cryptographers
Chinese cryptographers
Living people
1967 births